John O'Leary (16 December 1880 – 8 March 1967) was a British sports shooter. He competed in three events at the 1924 Summer Olympics.

References

External links
 

1880 births
1967 deaths
British male sport shooters
Olympic shooters of Great Britain
Shooters at the 1924 Summer Olympics